Leptosynapta inhaerens is a marine species of sea cucumber that lives buried in the sand on shores.

Description 
This species of holothurian is pink, with a slender and soft body. It can reach 30 cm long. Its body is sticky, hence its species name inhaerens .

Distribution 
It can be found on the south and west coasts of Britain, and between Norway and Brittany.

Habitat 
L. inhaerens lives buried in sand or mud on the lower shore.

Ecology 
This species is psammivorous, which means it digests organic matter from the sand.

References

Synaptidae